Colbath Cottage is a historic cure cottage located at Saranac Lake in the town of Harrietstown, Franklin County, New York.  It was built in 1896 and is a -story, wood-frame building on a rubble stone foundation, clad in wooden clapboard and shingles in a staggered butt pattern, and covered by a multiple gable roof.

It was listed on the National Register of Historic Places in 1992.

References

Houses on the National Register of Historic Places in New York (state)
Queen Anne architecture in New York (state)
Colonial Revival architecture in New York (state)
Houses completed in 1896
Houses in Franklin County, New York
National Register of Historic Places in Franklin County, New York